The Christmas Album is the 1997 album from the Nitty Gritty Dirt Band. This album reached 93 on the US Country charts.

Track listing
 "Colorado Christmas" (Steve Goodman) – 3:39
 "We Three Kings" (John Henry Hopkins Jr., traditional arrangement) – 3:00
 "Christmas Dinner" (Ernest Ford) – 2:12
 "One Christmas Tree" (Jimmy Ibbotson, Jeff Hanna) – 4:04
 "Silent Night" (Franz Gruber, Joseph Mohr, traditional arrangement) – 3:53
 "This Christmas Morning" (Bob Carpenter) – 3:39
 "Silver Bells" (Jay Livingston, Ray Evans, traditional arrangement) – 2:54
 "It Came Upon the Midnight Clear" (Edmund Sears, Arthur Sullivan, Richard Storrs Willis, traditional arrangement) – 3:15
 "Love Has Brought Him Here" (Bob Carpenter, Tom Kell) – 3:03
 "Little Drummer Boy" (Harry Simeone, Katherine Kennicott Davis, Henry Onorati, traditional arrangement) – 3:04
 "Jingle Bells" (James Lord Pierpont, traditional arrangement) – 2:57

Personnel
 Jeff Hanna – vocals, guitar
 Jim Ibbotson – vocals, guitar, mandolin, bass
 Jimmie Fadden – drums, harmonica
 Bob Carpenter – vocals, keyboards

With
 Chris Engleman – electric bass
 Gary Lunn – electric bass

Special Guest Musicians
 Alison Krauss – vocals on "Colorado Christmas", fiddle on "We Three Kings"
 John McEuen – 5-string banjo on "Colorado Christmas" and "We Three Kings", mandolin on "Colorado Christmas"
 Richie Furay – vocals on "One Christmas Tree" and "This Christmas Morning"
 Vassar Clements – fiddle on "Christmas Dinner"

Production
 Producer – Nitty Gritty Dirt Band

References
All information from album liner notes unless otherwise noted.

Nitty Gritty Dirt Band albums
1997 Christmas albums
Christmas albums by American artists
Country Christmas albums